Jacques Giraldeau (July 16, 1927February 28, 2015) was a Canadian documentary filmmaker from Quebec, who was known primarily for his films about visual arts and artists. A longtime director, writer and producer for the National Film Board of Canada, he is most noted as the winner in 1996 of the Prix Albert-Tessier, the lifetime achievement award in cinema from the Prix du Québec.

Many of his films were released in a VHS compilation in 1995, and as a DVD compilation in 2009.

Filmography
 1963: Lewis Mumford on the City, Part 3: The City and Its Region
 1963: Lewis Mumford on the City, Part 4: The Heart of the City
 1963: Lewis Mumford on the City, Part 5: The City as Man's Home
 1963: Lewis Mumford on the City, Part 6: The City and the Future
 1964: Down Through the Years (Au hasard du temps)
 1965: The Shape of Things (La Forme des choses)
 1965: Give Me a Hand
 1966: Element 3 (Élément 3)
 1967: Gros-Morne
 1968: Les Fleurs, c'est pour Rosemont
 1968: Bozarts
 1979: La Toile d'araignée
 1984: Opéra zéro
 1988: Moving Picture (L'Homme de papier)
 1989: La Toile blanche
 1989: Le Tableau noir
 1991: The Irises (Les Iris)
 1992: Les amoureux de Montréal

References

External links

1927 births
2015 deaths
Canadian documentary film directors
Canadian documentary film producers
Canadian cinematographers
Canadian film editors
Film directors from Montreal
French Quebecers
National Film Board of Canada people
Governor General's Award in Visual and Media Arts winners